Slavery in Ethiopia existed for centuries, going as far back as 1495 BC. There are also sources indicating the export of slaves from the Aksumite Kingdom (100–940 AD). The practice formed an integral part of Ethiopian society, Ethiopians from the SW of the country were sold to many countries like Egypt, Persia and many Arabian countries, including those who did not approve of the institution, such as Emperor Menelik II (1889–1913) and Emperor Haile Selassie (Ethiopia's regent, 1916–1930 and Emperor of Ethiopia, 1930–1974), are said to have owned slaves by the thousands (Pankhurst, 1968, p. 75.).

Slaves were arbitrarily taken throughout the land though in particular with Ethiopia's southern hinterland as war captives were another source of slaves, though the perception, treatment and duties of these prisoners was markedly different. One of the first written laws to regulate slavery in the Ethiopian region was The Fetha Nagast (The Law of the Kings), a traditional law for Ethiopian Orthodox Christians. Under this law, one category of people that could legally be enslaved was prisoners of war. It declared:

The law also provided for the enslavement of non-believers and the children of slaves.

Slavery could also be imposed as a punishment for committing certain crimes, also known as “punitive enslavement.” Emperor Menilek's 1899 decree mandating the enslavement of thieves and people who sold slaves in violation of his ban is a good example of this form of enslavement.

Emperor Tewodros II (1855–1869) and Emperor Yohannes IV (1872–1889) both attempted to end slavery in 1854 and 1884 respectively. Slavery in Ethiopia was largely the result of criminal activity and prisoners of war brought about by rival ideological factions and territorial disputes of expanding principalities, legacy of inheritance, and religious conflict.

Emperor Menelik II was no different in his aversion to the institution of slavery, although he was not always consistent in his actions as he would ironically punish slavers with slavery. In 1876 he issued a proclamation in which he prohibited Christians from buying and selling slaves in his territories and mandated that any Muslim caught traveling with slaves should be taken into custody and tried. (Pankhurst, 1968, p. 100.) This law was ineffective, in part because Menelik himself violated its terms by, among other things, continuing to levy taxes from slave markets in an attempt to undermine slave traders in areas beyond his control. Upon his ascent to the throne in 1889, he again issued a decree abolishing slavery. (Encyclopaedia Aethiopica 680.) However, he made an exception for prisoners of war and he used this exception to enslave war captives by the thousands. As noted above, he also used slavery and enslavement as a tool for punishing enemies of the state.

Menelik's administration had succeeded in reducing slavery but Menelik found himself with more slaves as a result of having punished so many slave owners and received profits from the trade which presented a moral conundrum to the image of Ethiopia as expressed by the Hatian general Benito Sylvain who visited Ethiopia in 1895-96 and served as dejazmach in Meneliks army. In an endeavor to end slavery Menelik increased the tax such as the case with slaves brought into Shewa and each one that was sold there. The exact number of slaves owned by Menelik is disputed. Coastal raids in the south by the Emperor's Army we're known to free slaves and by the same token make slaves of those guilty of having broke the law or went against the Fetha Nagast. Because slavery was so widespread at the time Ethiopians who could afford to own slaves but refused to pay taxes on them were either placed into a kind of debtors' prison or subjected to slavery themselves to pay off the tax in an attempt to reduce the incentive to own slaves.

Some argue his attempt of the abolition of slavery was first implemented in 1910 with a letter to jimma Oromo king Abba Jifar, ruler of Jimma at the time, was thought to have sold Shenquella slaves to the Indian Ocean slave trade.

The abolition of slavery was put into law during the Italian occupation period with the issue of two laws in October 1935 and April 1936. The abolition of slavery as far as a modern written constitution became a high priority for the Haile Selassie government in 1942. Emperor Haile Selassie put this in a written constitution in 1942. After the Italians were expelled Ethiopia officially abolished slavery and involuntary servitude, by making it a law on 26 August 1942.

Ethiopia ratified 1926 Slavery Convention in 1969.

Overview

Slavery was fundamental to the social, political and economic order of medieval Ethiopia. Discrimination in the territory was primarily directed at ethnic minorities, pagans who were forced to convert, and those who rejected the divine law of Fetha Nagast. Collectively, these groups were known as barya, derogatory terms originally denoting slave descent, irrespective of the individual's family history.

Traditionally, discrimination against perceived barya transcended class and remained in effect regardless of social position or parentage. The exact use of the term barya is extended to non-Ethiopians as well such as the case with Italian prisoners of war who were subjected to slavery after the First Italo-Ethiopian War, many of whom were owned by Ras Alula Engida.

According to Henry Salt, the Abyssinian highlanders also actively hunted their Muslim rivals in the south during the 19th century and had a history of raiding the north. Relations between the Muslims and Christian highlanders were exacerbated with an ongoing suspicion since the 16th century, where Muslims embarked on a Conquest of Abyssinia.

Following the abolition of the slave trade in the 1940s, the freed barya were typically employed as unskilled labour.
 
Although other populations in Ethiopia also faced varying degrees of discrimination, little of that adversity was by contrast on account of racial differences. It was instead more typically rooted in disparities in religion, culture, class, and competition for economic status.

Forms of slavery
Multiple forms of slavery and servitude have existed throughout African history, and were shaped by indigenous practices of slavery as well as the Roman institution of slavery (and the later Christian views on slavery), the Islamic institutions of slavery via the Muslim slave trade, and eventually the Atlantic slave trade. Slavery was a part of the economic structure of African societies for many centuries, although the extent varied. Ibn Battuta, who visited the ancient kingdom of Mali in the mid-14th century, recounts that the local inhabitants vied with each other in the number of slaves and servants they had, and was himself given a slave boy as a "hospitality gift." In sub-Saharan Africa, the slave relationships were often complex, with rights and freedoms given to individuals held in slavery and restrictions on sale and treatment by their masters.

The largest slavery-driven polity in the Horn of Africa during the 14th century was the Adal Sultanate.

In Ethiopia

Before the imperial expansion to the south Asandabo, Saqa, Hermata and Bonga were the primary slave markets for the kingdom of Guduru, Limmu-Enaria, Jimma and Kaffa. The merchant villages adjacent to these major markets of southwestern Ethiopia were invariably full of slaves, which the upper classes exchanged for the imported goods they coveted. The slaves were walked to the large distribution markets like Basso in Gojjam,  Aliyu Amba and Abdul Resul in Shewa. The primary source of slaves for the southern territories was the continuous wars & raids between various clans and tribes which has been going on for thousands of years, and it usually follows with large scale slavery that was very common during the battles of that era. Slaves were often provided by various rulers who raided their neighbors. According to Donald Levine, it was common to see Oromos making slaves of Konso and the southern people. Famine was another source of slaves, and during times of recurrent drought and widespread cattle disease, slave markets throughout the country will be flooded with victims of famine. For instance, the Great Famine of 1890-91 forced many people from the Christian north (modern-day Tigray and Eritrea) as well as southern Ethiopia to even sell their children and, at times, themselves as slaves to Muslim merchants. Since religious law did not permit Christians to participate in the trade, Muslims dominated the slave trade, often going farther and farther afield to find supplies.

In 1880, Menelik II, the Amhara ruler of the Ethiopian province of Shoa, began to overrun southern Ethiopia todaus Oromia, sidama, gambella, southern nation. This was largely in retaliation for the 16th century Oromo Expansion as well as the Zemene Mesafint ("Era of the Princes"), a period during which a succession of Oromo feudal rulers dominated the highlanders. Chief among these was the Yejju dynasty, which included Aligaz of Yejju and his brother Ali I of Yejju. Ali I founded the town of Debre Tabor, which became the dynasty's capital. The Oromo expansion of 16th century absorbed many indigenous people of the kingdoms which were part of the Abyssinian empire. Some historically recorded peoples and kingdoms includes Kingdom of Damot, Kingdom of Ennarea, Sultanate of Showa, Sultanate of Bale, Gurage, Gafat, Ganz province, Maya, Hadiya Sultanate, Fatagar, Sultanate of Dawaro, Werjih, Gidim, Adal Sultanate, Sultanate of Ifat and other people of Abyssinian Empire were made Gabaros (serfs) while the native ancient names of the territories were replaced by the name of the Oromo clans who conquered it. The Oromos adopted the Gabbaros in mass, adopting them to the qomo (clan) in a process known as Mogasa and Gudifacha. Through collective adoption, the affiliated groups were given new genealogies and started counting their putative ancestors in the same way as their adoptive kinsmen, and as a Gabarro they are required to pay their tributes and provide service for their conquerors.

Amharas during their expansions and invasions of the 14th century under their king Amda Seyon would enslave, overrun and rule many of the native Muslim and Pagan kingdoms and nations such as Sultanate of Showa, Sultanate of Ifat, Hadiya Sultanate, Damot, Dawaro the Agew and many more.

In southern Ethiopia the Gibe and Kaffa kings exercised their right to enslave and sell the children of parents too impoverished to pay their taxes. Guma is one of the Gibe states that adjoins Enarea where Abba Bogibo rules and under his rule inhabitants of Guma were more than those of any other country doomed to slavery. Before Abba Rebu's adoption of Islamism the custom of selling whole families for minor crimes done by a single individual was a custom.

In the centralized Oromo states of Gibe valleys and Didesa, agriculture and Industry sector was done mainly by slave labour. The Gibe states includes Jemma, Gudru, Limmu-Enarya and Gera. Adjacent to western Oromo states exists the Omotic kingdom of Kaffa as well as other southern states in the Gojab and Omo river basins where slaves were the main agrarian producers. In Gibe states one-third of the general population was composed of slaves while slaves were between half and two-thirds of the general population in Kingdoms of Jimma, Kaffa, Walamo, Gera, Janjero and Kucha. Even Kaffa reduced the number of slaves by mid 19th century fearing its large bonded population.  Slave labour in the agriculture sector in southwest Ethiopia means that slaves constituted higher proportion of the general population when compared to the northern Ethiopia where agrarian producers are mainly free Gabbars. Gabbars owns their own land as “rist” and their legal obligation is to pay one fifth of their produce as land tax and asrat, another one-tenth, with a total of one third of total production paid as tax to be shared between the gult holder and the state. In addition to these taxes, peasants of north Ethiopia have informal obligations where they will be forced “to undertake courvéé (forced labour)" such as farming, grinding corn, and building houses and fences that claimed up to one-third of their time. This same Gabbar system was applied to South Ethiopia after the expansion of Shewan Kingdom while most of the southern ruling classes were made Balabates (gult holders) until emperor Haile Selassie abolished fiefdom (gultegna), the central institution of feudalism, in the south and north Ethiopia by 1966 after growing domestic pressure for land reform.

In 1869, Menelik became king of Shewa. He thereafter set out to conquer Oromia, completely annexing the territory by 1900. Jimmas Oromo king Abba Jifar II also is said to have more than 10,000 slaves and allowed his armies to enslave the captives during a battle with all his neighboring clans. This practice was common between various tribes and clans of Ethiopia for thousands of years.

By the second half of the nineteenth century, Ethiopia provided an ever-increasing number of slaves for the slave trade, as the geographical focus of the trade had shifted from the Atlantic basin to Ethiopia, the Nile basin and Southeast Africa down to Mozambique. According to Donald, indeed a large part of the increased slave trade in the first half of the nineteenth century consisted of captives being sold by other neighbouring clans and tribes in the south & in Oromo areas.

The nineteenth century witnessed an unprecedented growth in slavery in the country, especially in southern Oromo towns, which expanded as the influx of slaves grew. In the Christian highlands, especially in the province of Shoa, the number of slaves was quite large by the mid-century. However, despite the war raids, the Oromo were not considered by the highlander Amharas  groups as being racially slave barya, owing to their common Afro-Asiatic ancestry.

The Abyssinian Church justified slavery with its version of the Biblical Curse of Ham.
Another justification was civilizing the savages.

Indian Ocean slave trade 

The Indian Ocean slave trade was multi-directional and changed over time. To meet the demand for menial labor, slaves sold to Muslim slave traders by local slave raiders, Ethiopian chiefs and kings from the interior,  were sold over the centuries to customers in Egypt, the Arabian peninsula, the Persian Gulf, India, the Far East, the Indian Ocean islands, Somalia and Ethiopia.

During the second half of the 19th century and early 20th century, slaves shipped from Ethiopia had a high demand in the markets of the Arabian peninsula and elsewhere in the Middle East. They were mostly domestic servants, though some served as agricultural labourers, or as water carriers, herdsmen, seamen, camel drivers, porters, washerwomen, masons, shop assistants and cooks. The most fortunate of the men worked as the officials or bodyguards of the ruler and emirs, or as business managers for rich merchants. They enjoyed significant personal freedom and occasionally held slaves of their own. Besides Javanese and Chinese girls brought in from the Far East, young Ethiopian females were among the most valued concubines. The most beautiful ones often enjoyed a wealthy lifestyle, and became mistresses of the elite or even mothers to rulers. The principal sources of these slaves, all of whom passed through Matamma, Massawa and Tadjoura on the Red Sea, were the southwestern parts of Ethiopia, in the Oromo and Sidama country.

The most important outlet for Ethiopian slaves was undoubtedly Massawa. Trade routes from Gondar, located in the Ethiopian Highlands led to Massawa via Adwa. Slave drivers from Gondar took 100-200 slaves in a single trip to Massawa, the majority of whom were female.

A small number of eunuchs were also acquired by the slave traders in the southern parts of Ethiopia. Mainly consisting of young children, they led the most privileged lives and commanded the highest prices in the Islamic global markets because of their rarity. They served in the harems of the affluent or guarded holy sites. Some of the young boys had become eunuchs due to the battle traditions that were at the time endemic to Arsi and Borena of southern Ethiopia. However, the majority came from the Badi Folia principality in the Jimma region, situated to the southeast of Enarea. The local Oromo rulers were so disturbed by the custom that they had driven out all of those in their kingdoms who practiced it.

Successful abolition
The abolition of slavery became a high priority for the Haile Selassie administration which began in 1930. His policy was to announce abolition while gradually implementing it to avoid disrupting the rural economy.  The main international pressure was mobilized by The West with such civil rights figures as Tekle Hawariat Tekle Mariyam spearheading the abolitionist movement while working through the League of Nations.  Under the pretense of abolishing slavery (and a border incident), Italy invaded Ethiopia in 1935.  Italy ignored international condemnation and demands by the League of Nations to depart.  During Italian rule, the occupation government issued two laws in October 1935 and in April 1936 which abolished slavery and, freed 420,000 Ethiopian slaves.  After the Italians were expelled, Emperor Haile Selassie returned to power and quickly abolished the actual practice in 1942.

Nature and characteristics
Slavery, as practiced within Ethiopia, differed depending on the class of slaves in question. The "Tiqur " (literally "black," with the connotation of 'dark-skinned') Shanqalla slaves in general sold for cheap. They were also mainly assigned hard work in the house and field.

On the other hand, the "Qay " (literally "red," with the connotation of 'light-skinned') Oromo and Sidama slaves had a much higher value and were carefully sorted according to occupation and age: Very young children up to the age of ten were referred to as Mamul. Their price was slightly lower than that of ten- to sixteen-year-old boys. Known as Gurbe, the latter young males were destined for training as personal servants. Men in their twenties were called Kadama. Since they were deemed beyond the age of training, they sold for a slightly lower price than the Gurbe. A male's value thus decreased with age. The most esteemed and desired females were girls in their teens, who were called Wosif. The most attractive among them were destined to become wives and concubines. Older women were appraised in accordance with their ability to perform household chores as well as their strength.

Efforts at abolition 
Initial efforts to abolish slavery in Ethiopia go as far back as the early 1850s, when Emperor Tewodros II outlawed the slave trade in his domain, albeit without much effect. Only the presence of the British in the Red Sea resulted in any real pressure on the trade. Both Emperor Tewodros II and Emperor Yohannes IV also outlawed slavery but since all tribes were not against slavery and the fact that the country was surrounded on all sides by slave raiders and traders, it was not possible to entirely suppress this practice even by the 20th century. By the mid-1890s, Menelik was actively suppressing the trade, destroying notorious slave market towns and punishing slavers with amputation. According to Chris Prouty, Menelik prohibited slavery while it was beyond his capacity to change the mind of his people regarding this age-old practice, that was widely prevalent throughout the country.

To gain international recognition for his nation, Haile Selassie formally applied to join the League of Nations in 1919. Ethiopia's admission was initially rejected due to concerns about slavery, the slave and arms trade in the country. Italy and Great Britain led the nations opposing Ethiopia's admission to the League of Nations, citing slavery in Ethiopia as a primary reason for their opposition. Ethiopia was eventually admitted in 1923, after signing the Convention of St. Germain, in which they agreed to make efforts to suppress slavery. The League of Nations later appointed the Temporary Slavery Commission in 1924 to inquire into slavery around the world. Despite the apparent measures to the contrary, slavery continued to be legal in Ethiopia even with its signing of the Slavery Convention of 1926.

Legacy
Although slavery was abolished in the early 1940s, following a ban under Italian occupation in 1936, the effects of Ethiopia's longstanding peculiar institution lingered. As a result, former President of Ethiopia Mengistu Haile Mariam was virtually absent from the country's controlled press in the first few weeks of his seizure of power. He also consciously avoided making public appearances, here too on the belief that his appearance would not sit well with the country's deposed political elite, particularly the Amhara. By contrast, Mengistu's rise to prominence was hailed by the southern Shanqella groups as a personal victory. Ethnic discrimination against the 'barya' or Shanqella communities in Ethiopia still exists, affecting access to political and social opportunities and resources.

Some slaves of Ethiopia or their descendants have also held the highest positions. Abraha, the 6th century South Arabian ruler who led an army of 70,000, whom was appointed by the Axumites was a slave of a Byzantine Merchant in the Eritrean port of Adulis. Habte Giyorgis Dinagde and Balcha Abanefso were originally slaves taken as prisoners of war at Menelik's court who ended up becoming so powerful, especially Habte Giorgis, became war minister and first prime minister of the empire who later became king-maker of Ethiopia after Menelik's death. Ejegayehu Lema Adeyamo, mother of Emperor Menelik who actually founded modern Ethiopia, is said to be a slave. Mengistu Haile Mariam, who declared a republic and ruled Ethiopia with Marxist–Leninist ideology, is also said to be the son of a former slave.

References

Further reading

External links 
 Ethiopian Slave Trade
 East African Slave Trade

Slavery by country
Society of Ethiopia
History of Ethiopia by topic
History of slavery
Slavery in Africa
Human rights abuses in Ethiopia